The 2018 United States House of Representatives elections in Colorado were held on November 6, 2018, to elect the seven U.S. representatives from the state of Colorado, one from each of the state's seven congressional districts. The Republican and Democratic Party primaries in Colorado were held on June 26, 2018. The elections coincided with the gubernatorial election, as well as other elections to the House of Representatives, elections to the United States Senate, and various state and local elections.

Overview
Results of the 2018 United States House of Representatives elections in Colorado by district:

District 1

The 1st district is located in Central Colorado and includes most of the city of Denver. The incumbent is Democrat Diana DeGette, who has represented the district since 1997. She was re-elected to an eleventh term with 68% of the vote in 2016.

Democratic primary

Candidates
Declared
 Diana DeGette, incumbent
 Saira Rao
Eliminated at Convention
David Sedbrook (Democratic)

Endorsements

Results

Republican primary

Candidates
Declared
Casper Stockham

Results

General election

Results

District 2

The 2nd district is located in Northern Colorado and encompasses seven counties. The incumbent is Democrat Jared Polis, who has represented the district since 2009. He was re-elected to a fifth term with 57% of the vote in 2016.

Polis is running for Governor of Colorado. He won the Democratic nomination for the general election in November.

Democratic primary

Candidates
Declared
 Joe Neguse, former regent for the University of Colorado, former executive director of the Colorado Department of Regulatory Agencies, and nominee for Secretary of State of Colorado in 2014
 Mark Williams, businessman and former chair of the Boulder County Democratic Party

Withdrew
 Kristopher Larsen, Mayor of Nederland
 Howard Dotson, pastor and candidate for Loveland City Council in 2017
 Ken Toltz, businessman and nominee for CO-06 in 2000

Declined
Kerry Donovan, state senator for the 5th District (running for re-election)

Endorsements

Results

Republican primary

Candidates
Declared
 Peter Yu, businessman

Results

Libertarian primary

Candidates
Nominated

 Roger Barris

Withdrew
 Todd Mitchem

Independents

Candidates
Declared
 Nick Thomas

General election

Results

District 3

The 3rd district is located in Western and Southern Colorado and includes a large number of sparsely populated counties and the city of Grand Junction. The incumbent is Republican Scott Tipton, who has represented the district since 2011. He was re-elected to a fourth term with 55% of the vote in 2016. This is one of 80 Republican-held House districts targeted by the Democratic Congressional Campaign Committee in 2018.

Democratic primary

Candidates
Declared
 Diane Mitsch Bush, former state representative
 Karl Hanlon, Glenwood Springs city attorney
 Arn Menconi, former Eagle County commissioner

Withdrew
 Chris Kennedy, Grand Junction city councilman

Declined
Kerry Donovan, state senator for the 5th District (running for re-election)

Results

Republican primary

Candidates
Declared
Scott Tipton, incumbent

Results

General election

Polling

Results

District 4

The 4th district is located in Eastern Colorado and includes numerous sparsely populated counties.  The incumbent is Republican Ken Buck, who has represented the district since 2015. He was re-elected to a second term with 64% of the vote in 2016.

Democratic primary

Candidates
Declared
Chase Kohne
Karen McCormick

Eliminated at Convention
Larry Germanson
Richard Weil

Results

Endorsements

Republican primary

Candidates
Declared
Ken Buck, incumbent

Eliminated at Convention
 Jim Gunning, former Lone Tree mayor

Results

General election

Results

District 5

The 5th district is located in Central Colorado and includes Fremont, El Paso, Teller and Chaffee counties and the city of Colorado Springs. The incumbent is Republican Doug Lamborn, who has represented the district since 2007. He was re-elected to a sixth term with 62% of the vote in 2016.

Democratic primary

Candidates
Declared
Stephany Rose Spaulding

Primary Write-In Candidate
Marcus Murphy

Eliminated at Convention
Kimberly Sugarmen
Betty Field
Lori Furstenberg

Results

Republican primary

Declared
 Darryl Glenn, El Paso County Commissioner and 2016 Republican nominee for the U.S. Senate from Colorado
 Owen Hill, state senator
 Bill Rhea, retired Texas judge
 Tyler Stevens, former Green Mountain Falls Mayor
 Doug Lamborn, incumbent

Withdrawn
 Tom Strand, Colorado Springs City Councilman

Polling
{| class=wikitable
|- valign= bottom
! Poll source
! Date(s)administered
! Samplesize
! Margin oferror
! style="width:75px;"|DarrylGlenn
! style="width:75px;"|OwenHill
! style="width:75px;"|DougLamborn
! style="width:75px;"|BillRhea
! style="width:75px;"|TylerStevens
! style="width:75px;"|Undecided
|-
| Magellan Strategies
| align=center| May 20–21, 2018
| align=center| 519
| align=center| ± 4.3%
| align=center| 27%
| align=center| 10%
|  align=center| 37%
| align=center| 2%
| align=center| 3%
| align=center| 21%

Results

General election

Results

District 6

The 6th district is located in Central Colorado and surrounds the city of Denver from the east, including the city of Aurora. The incumbent is Republican Mike Coffman, who has represented the district since 2009. He was re-elected to a fifth term with 51% of the vote in 2016. This is one of 80 Republican-held House districts targeted by the Democratic Congressional Campaign Committee in 2018.

Democratic primary

Candidates
Declared
 Jason Crow, attorney
 Levi Tillemann, businessman

Withdrew
Gabriel McArthur
David Aarestad

Results

Republican primary

Candidates
Declared
 Mike Coffman, incumbent

Results

General election

Endorsements

Polling

Results

District 7

The 7th district is located in Central Colorado, to the north and west of Denver and includes the cities of Thornton and Westminster and most of Lakewood. The incumbent is Democrat Ed Perlmutter, who has represented the district since 2007. He was re-elected to a sixth term with 55% of the vote in 2016.

Perlmutter announced a run for governor, but later withdrew from that race.  He later announced that he would not run for re-election. However, on August 21, 2017, he announced that he had changed his mind.

Colorado's 7th district was included on the initial list of Democratic-held seats being targeted by the National Republican Congressional Committee in 2018.  Former chair of the Jefferson County Republican Party and former vice chair of the Colorado Republican Party Don Ytterberg, who was the nominee for this seat in 2014, was rumored to be considering running.

Democratic primary

Candidates
Declared
 Ed Perlmutter, incumbent

Withdrew
 Dan Baer, former U.S. ambassador to the Organization for Security and Co-operation in Europe
 Andy Kerr, state senator
 Dominick Moreno, state senator
 Brittany Pettersen, state representative

Results

Republican primary

Candidates
Declared
Mark Barrington, Lakewood businessman

Results

Independents

Candidates
Declared
Nathan Clay

General election

Results

References

External links
Candidates at Vote Smart 
Candidates at Ballotpedia 
Campaign finance at FEC 
Campaign finance at OpenSecrets

Official campaign websites of first district candidates
Diana DeGette (D) for Congress
Casper Stockham (R) for Congress

Official campaign websites of second district candidates
Joe Neguse (D) for Congress
Peter Yu (R) for Congress

Official campaign websites of third district candidates
Diane Mitsch Bush (D) for Congress
Scott Tipton (R) for Congress

Official campaign websites of fourth district candidates
Ken Buck (R) for Congress
Karen McCormick (D) for Congress

Official campaign websites of fifth district candidates
Doug Lamborn (R) for Congress
Stephany Rose Spaulding (D) for Congress

Official campaign websites of sixth district candidates
Mike Coffman (R) for Congress
Jason Crow (D) for Congress

Official campaign websites of seventh district candidates
Mark Barrington (R) for Congress
Ed Perlmutter (D) for Congress

Colorado
2018
United States House of Representatives